A London fog is a hot tea-based drink that consists of Earl Grey tea, steamed milk, and vanilla syrup. 

It was invented in Vancouver, Canada, in the 1990s by Mary Loria. Loria, who was pregnant at the time, frequented Vancouver's Buckwheat Cafe. After inventing the drink, she began ordering the drink at other cafes and recommending it to others. The trend spread. Despite conceiving the drink herself, Loria does not know who created the name. The term "fog" refers to the steamed milk.

Ingredients 

The basic ingredients of a London fog are Earl Grey tea, vanilla flavouring, raw honey (optional), and milk of choice.

Variants 
Variations of the London fog involve substituting the tea leaves and using milk alternatives. In Scotland, this drink is known as a "Vancouver fog". It is popular in the Pacific Northwest and Canada's West Coast.

References

Tea
Canadian drinks
Culture of Vancouver